Richard Copeland Todd (1792–1852) was an American pioneer from Chester, South Carolina. 

In 1822 he and his wife Martha settled in what is now the Virginia Highland neighborhood of Atlanta, buying their farm from William Zachary, who had bought it in 1812. Their descendants resided on the original Todd homestead site at 816 Greenwood Avenue until the 1960s. The Todds were buried nearby, but their graves were relocated to an actual cemetery in the 1950s.

Todd's older sister Sarah (d. 1865) was married to Hardy Ivy, the first European-American settler within the original Atlanta city limits. The road between their two farms was known as Todd Road, a portion of which still exists in Virginia Highland.

References
 History of Virginia Highland, Virginia Highland Civic Association
 Linda Merrill, "History of Virginia Highland, Part I", published in the Virginia-Highland Voice, Winter 2009

History of Atlanta